In 1913 the Roads and Trails Fund Act in the United States created a permanent Federal fund which states could use to cover 10% of the cost for road construction or reconstruction, supervising, inspecting, actual building, and incurrence of all costs incidental to the construction or reconstruction of a road.

1913 in American law
62nd United States Congress
United States federal legislation
United States federal legislation articles without infoboxes